Basketligaen Norge, better known as BLNO is Norway's premier professional men's basketball league. It was established in 2000. The competition is organised by the Norwegian Basketball Federation (NBBF).

Clubs

Former clubs

Finals

Awards

Most Valuable Player

Finals MVP

Young Player of the Year

Defensive Player of the Year

External links 
Eurobasket.com League Page

  
Basketball competitions in Norway
Basketball leagues in Europe
Bask
Sports leagues established in 2000
2000 establishments in Norway
Professional sports leagues in Norway